Fredrick "Amass" Amankona (born 2 August 1995) is a Ghanaian professional footballer who plays for USL League Two club South Bend Lions FC as a midfielder.

Career

College and amateur
Amankona played three years of college soccer at the University of Dayton from 2013 to 2015. Prior to that, he'd spent a year at the University of Ghana.

While at college, Amankona played with Premier Development League side Charlotte Eagles.

Professional
On 19 January 2016, Amankona was selected 46th overall in the 2016 MLS SuperDraft by Real Salt Lake. However, he wasn't signed by Salt Lake, instead joining their United Soccer League affiliate Real Monarchs.

On 8 February 2018, Amankona joined the Indy Eleven of the United Soccer League.

On 4 January 2019, Amankona made the move to USL League One club Richmond Kickers.

In March 2021, Amankona joined USL League Two side South Bend Lions FC ahead of their first season of play.

References

External links
 
 

1995 births
Living people
Ghanaian footballers
Ghanaian expatriate footballers
Association football forwards
Charlotte Eagles players
Dayton Flyers men's soccer players
Expatriate soccer players in the United States
Indy Eleven players
Real Monarchs players
Real Salt Lake draft picks
Richmond Kickers players
Footballers from Kumasi
USL Championship players
USL League One players
USL League Two players
Ghanaian expatriate sportspeople in the United States
Dayton Dutch Lions players